Michael Connolly may refer to:
 Michael Connolly (Canadian politician) (born 1994), Canadian politician in Alberta
 Michael Connolly (hurler) (born 1954), Irish retired hurler
 Michael Connolly (footballer) (1922–2002), Irish soccer player
 Michael Connolly (Irish politician) (1860–1945), Irish Cumann na nGaedhael politician
 Michael Connolly (Medal of Honor) (1855–?), American sailor and Medal of Honor recipient
 Michael J. Connolly (born 1947), former politician; Massachusetts Secretary of the Commonwealth, 1979–1994

See also 
Mike Connolly (disambiguation)
Michael Connelly (disambiguation)
Michael Conneely (born 1949), Irish hurler